Chapulin or Chapulín may refer to:

 El Chapulín Colorado, Mexican television series
 Chapulines, Mexican food
 Luis "Chapulín" Díaz, Mexican racing driver
 Chapulling, Turkish neologism

See also
Chapulineros de Oaxaca, Mexican football team